Industrial music is a genre of music that draws on harsh, mechanical, transgressive or provocative sounds and themes. AllMusic defines industrial music as the "most abrasive and aggressive fusion of rock and electronic music" that was "initially a blend of avant-garde electronics experiments (tape music, musique concrète, white noise, synthesizers, sequencers, etc.) and punk provocation". The term was coined in the mid-1970s with the founding of Industrial Records by members of Throbbing Gristle and Monte Cazazza. While the genre name originated with Throbbing Gristle's emergence in the United Kingdom, artists and labels vital to the genre also emerged in the United States and other countries.

The first industrial artists experimented with noise and aesthetically controversial topics, musically and visually, such as fascism, sexual perversion, and the occult. Prominent industrial musicians include Throbbing Gristle, Monte Cazazza, SPK, Boyd Rice, Cabaret Voltaire, and Z'EV. On Throbbing Gristle's 1977 debut album The Second Annual Report, they coined the slogan "industrial music for industrial people". The industrial music scene also developed strongly in Chicago, with the city's Wax Trax! Records at one point leading the industrial music scene. The precursors that influenced the development of the genre included 1940s musique concrète and varied world music sources in addition to rock-era acts such as Faust, Kraftwerk, the Velvet Underground, and Lou Reed's Metal Machine Music (1975). Musicians also cite writers such as William S. Burroughs and J. G. Ballard, and artists such as Brion Gysin, as influences.

While the term was self-applied by a small coterie of groups and individuals associated with Industrial Records in the late 1970s, it was broadened to include artists influenced by the original movement or using an "industrial" aesthetic. Over time, the genre's influence spread into and blended with styles including ambient, synth music and rock such as Front 242, Front Line Assembly, KMFDM, and Sister Machine Gun, acts associated with the Chicago-based Wax Trax! Records imprint. Electro-industrial music is a primary subgenre that developed in the 1980s, with the most notable bands in the genre being Front Line Assembly and Skinny Puppy. The two other most notable hybrid genres are industrial rock and industrial metal, which include bands such as Nine Inch Nails, Ministry, Rammstein, and Fear Factory, the first three of which released a platinum-selling album each in the 1990s.

History

Precursors
Industrial music drew from a broad range of predecessors. According to the Oxford English Dictionary, the genre was first named in 1942 when The Musical Quarterly called Dmitri Shostakovich's 1927 Symphony No. 2 "the high tide of 'industrial music'." Similarly, in 1972 The New York Times described works by Ferde Grofé (especially 1935's A Symphony in Steel) as a part of "his 'industrial music' genre [that] called on such instruments as four pairs of shoes, two brooms, a locomotive bell, a pneumatic drill and a compressed-air tank". Though these compositions are not directly tied to what the genre would become, they are early examples of music designed to mimic machinery noise and factory atmosphere. Early examples of industrial music are arguably found in Pierre Schaeffer's 1940s musique concrète and the tape music of Halim El-Dabh, the former of which is akin to the aesthetics of 1970s industrial music, while artists such as early 20th century Italian futurist Luigi Russolo laid the groundwork for the genre with his book and work The Art of Noises (1913) reflecting "the sounds of a modern industrial society".

Brian Olenwick of AllMusic stated the 1960s English experimental group AMM as originators of the genre, as well as to electronica, free improvisation and noise music, writing that the "experimentation in sonic assault, noise, and chance sound (including transistor radios)" on their debut album AMMMusic (1967) would "reach the rock fringes in the work of industrial groups like Test Dept". Pitchfork attributes the Red Krayola as "the primary oracle for a generation of art punks, industrial savants, and new-wave scientists", with the 1967 record The Parable of Arable Land being called a "precursor to industrial rock" by AllMusic's Ritchie Unterberger, and their 1968 follow-up God Bless the Red Krayola and All Who Sail With It being dubbed "bootleg Einstürzende Neubauten at its grimiest atonality" by Pitchfork'''s Alex Lindhardt. Cromagnon's album Orgasm (1969) has been cited by AllMusic's Alex Henderson as foreshadowing industrial, noise rock and no wave, with the track "Caledonia" resembling "a Ministry or Revolting Cocks recording from 1989".

In the book Interrogation Machine: Laibach and NSK, Alexei Monroe argues that Kraftwerk were particularly significant in the development of industrial music, as the "first successful artists to incorporate representations of industrial sounds into nonacademic electronic music." Industrial music was created originally by using mechanical and electric machinery, and later advanced synthesizers, samplers and electronic percussion as the technology developed. Monroe also argues for Suicide as an influential contemporary of the industrial musicians. Groups cited as inspirational by the founders of industrial music include the Velvet Underground, Joy Division, and Martin Denny. Genesis P-Orridge of Throbbing Gristle had a cassette library including recordings by the Master Musicians of Jajouka, Kraftwerk, Charles Manson, and William S. Burroughs. P-Orridge also credited 1960s rock such as the Doors, Pearls Before Swine, the Fugs, Captain Beefheart, and Frank Zappa in a 1979 interview. The dissonant electronic work of krautrock group Faust was an influence on industrial artists.

Chris Carter also enjoyed and found inspiration in Pink Floyd and Tangerine Dream. Boyd Rice was influenced by the music of '60s girl groups and tiki culture. Z'EV cited Christopher Tree (Spontaneous Sound), John Coltrane, Miles Davis, Tim Buckley, Jimi Hendrix, and Captain Beefheart, among others together with Tibetan, Balinese, Javanese, Indian, and African music as influential in his artistic life. Cabaret Voltaire cited Roxy Music as their initial forerunners, as well as Kraftwerk's Trans-Europe Express. Cabaret Voltaire also recorded pieces reminiscent of musique concrète and composers such as Morton Subotnick. Nurse with Wound cited a long list of obscure free improvisation and Krautrock as recommended listening. 23 Skidoo borrowed from Fela Kuti and Miles Davis's On the Corner. Many industrial groups, including Einstürzende Neubauten, took inspiration from world music.

Many of the initial industrial musicians preferred to cite artists or thinkers, rather than musicians, as their inspiration. Simon Reynolds declares that "Being a Throbbing Gristle fan was like enrolling in a university course of cultural extremism." John Cage was an initial inspiration for Throbbing Gristle. SPK appreciated Jean Dubuffet, Marcel Duchamp, Jean Baudrillard, Michel Foucault, Walter Benjamin, Marshall McLuhan, Friedrich Nietzsche, and Gilles Deleuze, as well as being inspired by the manifesto of the eponymous Socialist Patients' Collective. Cabaret Voltaire took conceptual cues from Burroughs, J. G. Ballard, and Tristan Tzara. Whitehouse and Nurse with Wound dedicated some of their work to the Marquis de Sade; the latter also took impetus from the Comte de Lautréamont.

Another influence on the industrial aesthetic was Lou Reed's Metal Machine Music. Pitchfork Music cites this album as "inspiring, in part, much of the contemporary avant-garde music scene—noise, in particular." The album consists entirely of guitar feedback, anticipating industrial's use of non-musical sounds. The New York Times described American avant-garde band the Residents as having "presaged forms of punk, new wave and industrial music".

Early Years

Industrial RecordsIndustrial Music for Industrial People was originally coined by Monte Cazazza as the strapline for the record label Industrial Records, founded by British art-provocateurs Throbbing Gristle. The first wave of this music appeared with Throbbing Gristle, from London; Cabaret Voltaire, from Sheffield; and Boyd Rice (recording under the name NON), from the United States. Throbbing Gristle first performed in 1976, and began as the musical offshoot of the Kingston upon Hull-based COUM Transmissions. COUM was initially a psychedelic rock group, but began to describe their work as performance art in order to obtain grants from the Arts Council of Great Britain. COUM was composed of P-Orridge and Cosey Fanni Tutti. Beginning in 1972, COUM staged several performances inspired by Fluxus and Viennese Actionism. These included various acts of sexual and physical abjection. Peter Christopherson, an employee of commercial artists Hipgnosis, joined the group in 1974, with Carter joining the following year.

The group renamed itself Throbbing Gristle in September 1975, their name coming from a northern English slang word for an erection. The group's first public performance, in October 1976, was alongside an exhibit titled Prostitution, which included pornographic photos of Tutti as well as used tampons. Conservative politician Nicholas Fairbairn declared that "public money is being wasted here to destroy the morality of our society" and blasted the group as "wreckers of civilization." The group announced their dissolution in 1981, declaring that their "mission" has been "terminated."

Wax Trax! Records

Chicago record label Wax Trax! Records was prominent in the widespread attention industrial music received starting in the early 1980s. The label was started by Jim Nash and Dannie Flesher. The label's first official release was an EP in 1980 entitled Immediate Action by Strike Under. The label went on to distribute some of the most prominent names in industrial throughout the 1980s and 1990s. Wax Trax! also distributed industrial releases in the United States for the Belgium record label Play It Again Sam Records, and had opened a North American office dubbed Play It Again Sam U.S.A. as a division of Wax Trax!. Wax Trax! was subsequently purchased by TVT Records in 1992 who closed the independent Chicago label in 2001. Jim's Daughter, Julia Nash, resurrected Wax Trax! Records in 2011 with a 3-day charity event titled Wax Trax! Retrospectacle - 33 1/3 Year Anniversary. Julia officially released new material in 2014 under the Wax Trax! imprint and continues to run the record label from Chicago.

Expansion of the scene

The bands Clock DVA, Nocturnal Emissions, Whitehouse, Nurse with Wound, and SPK soon followed. Whitehouse intended to play "the most brutal and extreme music of all time", a style they eventually called power electronics. An early collaborator with Whitehouse, Steve Stapleton, formed Nurse with Wound, who experimented with noise sculpture and sound collage. Clock DVA described their goal as borrowing equally from surrealist automatism and "nervous energy sort of funk stuff, body music that flinches you and makes you move." 23 Skidoo, like Clock DVA, merged industrial music with African-American dance music, but also performed a response to world music. Performing at the first WOMAD Festival in 1982, the group likened themselves to Indonesian gamelan. Swedish act Leather Nun were signed to Industrial Records in 1978, being the first non-TG/Cazazza act to have an IR-release. Their singles eventually received significant airplay in the United States on college radio.

Across the Atlantic, similar experiments were taking place. In San Francisco, performance artist Monte Cazazza began recording noise music. Boyd Rice released several albums of noise, with guitar drones and tape loops creating a cacophony of repetitive sounds. In Boston, Sleep Chamber and other artists from Inner-X-Musick began experimenting with a mixture of powerful noise and early forms of EBM. In Italy, work by Maurizio Bianchi at the beginning of the 1980s also shared this aesthetic. In Germany, Einstürzende Neubauten mixed metal percussion, guitars, and unconventional instruments (such as jackhammers and bones) in stage performances that often damaged the venues in which they played. Blixa Bargeld, inspired by Antonin Artaud and an enthusiasm for amphetamines, also originated an art movement called Die Genialen Dilettanten. Bargeld is particularly well known for his hissing scream.

In January 1984, Einstürzende Neubauten performed a Concerto for Voice and Machinery at the Institute of Contemporary Arts (the same site as COUM's Prostitution exhibition), drilling through the floor and eventually sparking a riot. This event received front-page news coverage in England. Other groups who practiced a form of industrial "metal music" (that is, produced by the sounds of metal crashing against metal) include Test Dept, Laibach, and Die Krupps, as well as Z'EV and SPK. Test Dept were largely inspired by Russian Futurism and toured to support the 1984-85 UK miners' strike. Skinny Puppy embraced a variety of industrial forefathers and created a lurching, impalatable whole from many pieces. Swans, from New York City, also practiced a metal music aesthetic, though reliant on standard rock instrumentation. Laibach, a Slovenian group who began while Yugoslavia remained a single state, were very controversial for their iconographic borrowings from Stalinist, Nazi, Titoist, Dada, and Russian Futurist imagery, conflating Yugoslav patriotism with its German authoritarian adversary. Slavoj Žižek has defended Laibach, arguing that they and their associated Neue Slowenische Kunst art group practice an overidentification with the hidden perverse enjoyment undergirding authority that produces a subversive and liberatory effect. In simpler language, Laibach practiced a type of agitprop that was widely utilized by industrial and punk artists on both sides of the Atlantic.

Following the breakup of Throbbing Gristle, P-Orridge and Christopherson founded Psychic TV and signed to a major label. Their first album was much more accessible and melodic than the usual industrial style, and included hired work by trained musicians. Later work returned to the sound collage and noise elements of earlier industrial. They also borrowed from funk and disco. P-Orridge also founded Thee Temple ov Psychick Youth, a quasi-religious organization that produced video art. Psychic TV's commercial aspirations were managed by Stevo of Some Bizzare Records, who released many of the later industrial musicians, including Einstürzende Neubauten, Test Dept, and Cabaret Voltaire.

Around 1983, Cabaret Voltaire members were deeply interested in funk music and, with the encouragement of their friends from New Order, began to develop a form of dark but danceable electrofunk. Christopherson left Psychic TV in 1983 and formed Coil with John Balance. Coil made use of gongs and bullroarers in an attempt to conjure "Martian," "homosexual energy". David Tibet, a friend of Coil's, formed Current 93; both groups were inspired by amphetamines and LSD. J. G. Thirlwell, a co-producer with Coil, developed a version of black comedy in industrial music, borrowing from lounge as well as noise and film music. In the early 1980s, the Chicago-based record label Wax Trax! and Canada's Nettwerk helped to expand the industrial music genre into the more accessible electro-industrial and industrial rock genres.

Characteristics and history
The birth of industrial music was a response to "an age [in which] the access and control of information were becoming the primary tools of power." At its birth, the genre of industrial music was different from any other music, and its use of technology and disturbing lyrics and themes to tear apart preconceptions about the necessary rules of musical form supports the suggestion that industrial music is modernist music. The artists themselves made these goals explicit, even drawing connections to social changes they wished to argue for through their music.

The Industrial Records website explains that the musicians wanted to re-invent rock music, and that their uncensored records were about their relationship with the world. They go on to say that they wanted their music to be an awakening for listeners so that they would begin to think for themselves and question the world around them.  Industrial Records intended the term industrial to evoke the idea of music created for a new generation, with previous music being more agricultural: P-Orridge stated that "there's an irony in the word 'industrial' because there's the music industry. And then there's the joke we often used to make in interviews about churning out our records like motorcars —that sense of industrial. And ... up till then the music had been kind of based on the blues and slavery, and we thought it was time to update it to at least Victorian times—you know, the Industrial Revolution".

Early industrial music often featured tape editing, stark percussion and loops distorted to the point where they had degraded to harsh noise, such as the work of early industrial group Cabaret Voltaire, which journalist Simon Reynolds described as characterized by "hissing high hats and squelchy snares of rhythm-generator."  Carter of Throbbing Gristle invented a device named the "Gristle-izer", played by Christopherson, which comprised a one-octave keyboard and a number of cassette machines triggering various pre-recorded sounds.

Traditional instruments were often played in nontraditional or highly modified ways. Reynolds described the Cabaret Voltaire members' individual contributions as "[Chris] Watson's smears of synth slime; [Stephen] Mallinder's dankly pulsing bass; and [Richard H.] Kirk's spikes of shattered-glass guitar." Watson custom-built a fuzzbox for Kirk's guitar, producing a unique timbre. Carter built speakers, effects units, and synthesizer modules, as well as modifying more conventional rock instrumentation, for Throbbing Gristle. Tutti played guitar with a slide in order to produce glissandi, or pounded the strings as if it were a percussion instrument. Throbbing Gristle also played at very high volume and produced ultra-high and sub-bass frequencies in an attempt to produce physical effects, naming this approach as "metabolic music."

Vocals were sporadic, and were as likely to be bubblegum pop as they were to be abrasive polemics. Cabaret Voltaire's Stephen Mallinder's vocals were electronically treated.

The purpose of industrial music initially was to serve as a commentary on modern society by eschewing what artists saw as trite connections to the past. Throbbing Gristle opposed the elements of traditional rock music remaining in the punk rock scene, declaring industrial to be "anti-music." Early industrial performances often involved taboo-breaking, provocative elements, such as mutilation, sado-masochistic elements and totalitarian imagery or symbolism, as well as forms of audience abuse, such as Throbbing Gristle's aiming high powered lights at the audience.

Industrial groups typically focus on transgressive subject matter. In his introduction for the Industrial Culture Handbook (1983), Jon Savage considered some hallmarks of industrial music to be organizational autonomy, shock tactics, and the use of synthesizers and "anti-music." Furthermore, an interest in the investigation of "cults, wars, psychological techniques of persuasion, unusual murders (especially by children and psychopaths), forensic pathology, venereology, concentration camp behavior, the history of uniforms and insignia" and Aleister Crowley's magick was present in Throbbing Gristle's work, as well as in other industrial pioneers. Burroughs's recordings and writings were particularly influential on the scene, particularly his interest in the cut-up technique and noise as a method of disrupting societal control. Many of the first industrial musicians were interested in, though not necessarily sympathetic with, fascism. Throbbing Gristle's logo was based on the lightning symbol of the British Union of Fascists, while the Industrial Records logo was a photo of Auschwitz.

Expansion and offshoots (late 1980s and early 1990s)

As some of the originating bands drifted away from the genre in the 1980s, industrial music expanded to include bands influenced by new wave music, hip hop music, jazz, disco, reggae, and new age music, sometimes incorporating pop music songwriting.  A number of additional styles developed from the already eclectic base of industrial music. These offshoots include fusions with noise music, ambient music, folk music, post-punk and electronic dance music, as well as other mutations and developments. The scene has spread worldwide, and is particularly well represented in North America, Europe, and Japan. Substyles inspired by industrial music include dark ambient, power electronics, Japanoise, neofolk, electro-industrial, electronic body music, industrial hip hop, industrial rock, industrial metal, industrial pop, martial industrial, power noise, and witch house.

Mainstream success (1990s and 2000s)

In the 1990s, industrial music broke into the mainstream. The genre, previously ignored or criticized by music journalists, grew popular with disaffected middle-class youth in suburban and rural areas.  By this time, the genre had become broad enough that journalist James Greer called it "the kind of meaningless catch-all term that new wave once was". A number of acts associated with industrial music achieved commercial success during this period including Nine Inch Nails, Marilyn Manson, Rammstein and Orgy. 

Through the 1990s Nine Inch Nails and Marilyn Manson had several albums and EPs certified platinum by the Recording Industry Association of America (RIAA), including Nine Inch Nails' Broken (1992), The Downward Spiral (1994) and The Fragile,, and Marilyn Manson's Antichrist Superstar (1996) and Mechanical Animals.

See alsoAssimilate: A Critical History of Industrial Music''
Cassette culture
Experimental music
Rivethead
Steampunk 
List of industrial music festivals
List of industrial music bands
List of industrial music genres

Footnotes

References

 
 
 
 
 
 

 
Electronic music genres
British styles of music
Cassette culture 1970s–1990s